Pet adoption is the process of transferring responsibility for a pet that was previously owned by another party such as a person, shelter, or rescue organization.  Common sources for adoptable pets are animal shelters and rescue groups.  Some organizations give adopters ownership of the pet, while others use a guardianship model wherein the organization retains some control over the animal's future use or care. 

Online pet adoption sites have databases of pets being housed by thousands of animal shelters and rescue groups, and are searchable by the public. 

People deal with their unwanted pets in many ways. Some people have the pet euthanized (also known as putting down or putting to sleep), although many veterinarians do not consider this to be an ethical use of their resources for young and healthy animals, while others argue that euthanasia is a more humane option than leaving a pet in a cage for very long periods of time. Other people simply release the pet into the wild or otherwise abandon it, with the expectation that it will be able to take care of itself or that it will be found and adopted.  More often, these pets succumb to hunger, weather, traffic, or common and treatable health problems.  Some people euthanize pets because of terminal illnesses or injuries, while others even do it for common health problems that they cannot, or will not, pay to treat. More responsible owners will take the pet to a shelter, or call a rescue organization, where it will be cared for properly until a home can be found. Another method is rehoming (finding another owner). Reasons for surrendering a pet may be due to allergies, the pet-owner's death, divorce, the birth of a baby, or relocation. 

Homes cannot always be found, however, and euthanasia is often used for the excess animals to make room for newer pets, unless the organization has a no-kill policy. The Humane Society of the United States estimates that 2.4 million healthy, adoptable cats and dogs are euthanized each year in the US because of a lack of homes. Animal protection advocates campaign for adoption instead of buying animals in order to reduce the number of animals who have to be euthanized. Many shelters and animal rescues encourage the education of spaying or neutering a pet in order to reduce the number of animals euthanized in shelters and to help control the pet population.

To help lower the number of animals euthanized each year, some shelters have developed a no-kill policy.  Best Friends Animal Society is the largest no-kill shelter in the United States who adopts policies such as "Save Them All". Like this shelter and many others, they strive to keep their animals as long as it takes to find them new homes. City shelters and government funded shelters rarely have this policy because of the large number of animals they receive. No-kill shelters are usually run by groups that have volunteers or individuals with enough space to foster pets until a permanent home can be found. However, many of these groups and individuals have a finite number of spaces available. This means they will not take in new animals unless a space opens up, although they will often take back pets that they have adopted out previously. Sometimes they try to find the animals foster homes, in which the animal is placed in a home temporarily until someone adopts it.

Adoption process 

The central issue in adoption is whether the new adopter can provide a safe, secure, and permanent home for the adopted pet. Responsible shelters, pounds, and rescue organizations refuse to supply pets to people whom they deem ineligible based on assessing their inability to supply the adopted animal with a suitable home. Sometimes, a new owner may face training or behavioral challenges with a pet who has been neglected, abused, or left untrained. In the vast majority of cases, patience, training, persistence and consistency of care will help the pet overcome its past.

In Canada, reputable animal shelters or humane societies go through an extensive process to ensure that potential pets and their respective families are well suited and prepared for their lives ahead.  Adoption fees include spaying/neutering, veterinary care including all updated vaccinations, micro-chipping, and pet insurance.  Phone interviews, written questionnaires and in-person visits gather information on the potential family's history with pets, their lifestyle, habits, and their ability to take on the conditions of the adopted pet.  Adult pets can be more difficult to place due to the fact that they may have existing habits or behaviors that are difficult to manage or unwanted.  Unknown histories with rescue pets may also complicate their ability to be adopted.  Shelters and humane societies remain connected with information packages on why pets are unwanted, what to expect in the first days, week or month of pet adoption, guides, recommendations, specific behavior training requests and follow-up calls to ensure that everyone is satisfied with the adoption.

A forever home is the home of an adopter who agrees to be responsible for the animal for its entire life.  There are  a lot of times this happens and most of them care! two basic understandings of the concept. A broad interpretation simply says that the adopter of the pet agrees that the animal's well-being is now their personal responsibility for the rest of the animal's life. If the adopter can no longer keep the animal for any reason, they would need to be responsible for finding a healthy and happy home for the animal, and making sure that the people of the new home are taking good care of the animal for the rest of its life. Many animal rescues require adopters to return the animal to the rescue if they can no longer care for the animal. Should the adopter die before the animal, they should have a plan in place for the care of the animal.   A more restrictive view that some shelters attempt to integrate as part of the adoption agreement puts conditions on when and why the adopter could arrange to move the animal to a new family. For example, forever home agreements might specify that the adopter will not get rid of the animal for trivial reasons, or that the adopter will always be sure that the animal will be permitted should they move to a new residence. Some agreements might specify allergies or violent behavior on the part of the animal as reasons allowable for an adopter to relinquish the animal. It is common for families to celebrate Gotcha Day on the anniversary of the animal's arrival to their forever home.

One problem shelters are fighting to overcome is what they term "Big Black Dog syndrome". Big black dogs (BBDs) are consistently the hardest dogs to place—even if they're friendly, well trained, and in perfect health. This may be due to a number of factors, including fear stigma against certain breed types, attraction to ads and the fact that black dogs often do not photograph as well as lighter coated ones, and the fact that black dogs are often portrayed as aggressive in film and on television. Organizations have started campaigns to educate the public about BBD syndrome.

Similarly, shelters often have difficulty placing black cats due to common superstitions regarding black cats as bringers or harbingers of bad luck. Some shelters also have policies halting or limiting adoption of black cats immediately prior to Halloween for fear that the animals will be tortured, or used as "living decorations" for the holiday and then abandoned.  Rabbits are sometimes treated in the same manner prior to Easter as well, though they are rarely found in regular shelters since they are considered "exotic" (anything not a dog or cat).  Another popular fad is using a small dog, pretty white Persian kitten or other small pet as a fashion accessory to "complement an outfit".  Such animals may end up discarded, abandoned, or placed in a shelter when no longer needed.

Education about and promotion of pet adoption is also done by animal welfare organizations, and by local government animal control agencies. In 2016, the U.S. state of Georgia made the "adoptable dog" its state dog, similar to Colorado's adopted dog. 

After filling out an application to adopt an animal, there is also an adoption fee that must be paid to adopt an animal. Adoption fees have several purposes that they fulfill. If someone is willing to pay for an animal chances are they will take care of him or her and not abuse or neglect their new pet. Most animals that are of age are spayed or neutered and up to date on all of their shots. Depending on the shelter or organization, some pets may be microchipped which helps locate them if they are lost. The adoption fees are in place to help cover these costs, and also help provide food for the animals left in the shelter.

Responsible pet ownership 
According to the American Veterinary Medical Association (AVMA) (2018), being responsible for a pet requires commitment and should be considered a privilege. Similar to having children, the pet depends on the owner for their needs such as food and shelter, exercise and mental stimulation and veterinary care.  When choosing to adopt a pet, the lifestyle of the owner and the pet should be compatible. Once a pet is chosen, the owner should ensure the pet has been spayed or neutered and properly identified. The responsibility to the animal should be a commitment for the lifetime of the pet. If a situation arises that the owner can no longer provide a suitable household for the animal, it should be the owners first priority to re-home the pet. The AVMA presents guidelines for being a responsible pet owner.  This guideline is a good resource of what should be considered before becoming a pet owner.  Thoughtful consideration should be used to ensure the resources and commitment are present to make the animal - human relationship beneficial for both.

Rescue dogs
A rescue dog is a dog that has been placed in a new home after being abused, neglected, or abandoned by its previous owner. The term can also apply to dogs that are found as strays, surrendered by owners for a variety of reasons, including relationship breakdowns, moving home where the owner is unable or unwilling to take their pets, or elderly people who are not permitted to take their dog(s) into a nursing home.  

Many animal rescue organisations exist to rescue, protect, care and re-home dogs from unnecessary euthanasia. Common examples include the RSPCA in the United Kingdom and other Commonwealth countries, the ISPCA in Ireland, or the ASPCA in the United States. Many rescue dogs are rehomed quickly, but some wait longer for a home. This may be relevant when the dog is older.  Some agencies provide ongoing health care and support for older dogs after they have been placed in a home.  There are several charities dedicated to rescuing and rehoming older dogs.

The ASPCA estimates that approximately 3.3 million dogs in the United States enter shelters each year.  Of these, 1.6 million are adopted, 670,000 are euthanized, and 620,000 are returned to their previous owners.  A study conducted by the United States National Council on Pet Population Study and Policy (NCPPSP) in 1998 found that the main reasons for pets being relinquished are: family moving, landlord will not allow pets, too many animals in household, cost of keeping the pet, owner is having personal problems, inadequate facilities, and no homes available for puppies. The study found that 47.7% of dogs turned in to shelters were not altered (spayed or neutered), 33% had not been to a veterinarian, and 96% of dogs had no obedience training. The conclusion of the researchers was that the owners who were relinquishing their pets did not have the knowledge to be responsible dog owners, and that educational programs aimed at present and prospective owners would reduce the number of dogs relinquished to animal shelters.

See also 
 Greyhound adoption

References 

Pets
Abandoned animals